John Burton is an English stage and television actor, best known for his long-running role as Sergeant Goodfellow in  BBC television's Father Brown.

Selected filmography
Emmerdale (1997) (soap opera)
Coronation Street (1997) (soap opera)
Undercover Customs (1998) (TV series)
Where the Heart Is (1998) (TV series)
Noah's Ark (1998) (TV series)
Hollyoaks (1998) (soap opera)
Cold Feet (1998) (Series 1, Episode 1) (TV series)
Dalziel and Pascoe (1999) (TV series)
Clocking Off (1999) (TV series)
Always and Everyone (1999) (TV series)
The Bill (2000) (TV series)
Merseybeat (2001) (TV series)
Crossroads (2001) (soap opera)
Brookside (2002) (soap opera)
EastEnders (2003) (soap opera)
Casualty (2003) (TV series)
Crisis Command (2004) (TV series)
All in the Game (2005) (TV film)
Afterlife (2006) (TV series)
Father Brown (2014–present) (TV series)

External links
Official website

John Burton at Spotlight

Living people
English male film actors
English male stage actors
English male voice actors
English male soap opera actors
1967 births